The High Court of Botswana is the highest court of Botswana. It is based in Gaborone with branches in Lobatse, Francistown, and Maun. It operates above the Magistrates' Courts of Botswana, but below the Appeal Court. The High Court is headed by the Chief Justice of Botswana.

References 

Courts in Botswana